The Roman Catholic Church in Bolivia comprises four ecclesiastical provinces each headed by an archbishop. The provinces are in turn subdivided into 6 dioceses and 4 archdioceses each headed by a bishop or an archbishop. There are also 5 Apostolic Vicariates and one Military Ordinariate in Bolivia.

List of Dioceses

Ecclesiastical province of Cochabamba 
Archdiocese of Cochabamba
Diocese of Oruro
Prelature of Aiquille

Ecclesiastical province of La Paz 
Archdiocese of La Paz
Diocese of Coroico
Diocese of El Alto
Prelature of Corocoro

Ecclesiastical province of Santa Cruz de la Sierra 
Archdiocese of Santa Cruz de la Sierra
Diocese of San Ignacio de Velasco

Ecclesiastical province of Sucre 
Archdiocese of Sucre
Diocese of Potosí
Diocese of Tarija

Sui iuris Jurisdictions 
Military Ordinariate of Bolivia
Apostolic Vicariate of Camiri
Apostolic Vicariate of El Beni
Apostolic Vicariate of Ñuflo de Chávez
Apostolic Vicariate of Pando
Apostolic Vicariate of Reyes

References 
GCatholic.org.

Bolivia
Catholic dioceses